Radka Kocandová (born 3 July 1977) is a Czech former professional tennis player.

Biography
Pelikánová, as she was originally known, began competing professionally in 1992. 

She reached a best singles ranking of 180, with her best WTA Tour performance coming at the 1995 Prague Open, where she had a win over world number 62 Linda Harvey-Wild. During her career she featured in the qualifying draw at the US Open on three occasions.

As a doubles player she was ranked as high as 166 and won one ITF $25,000 title.

Since retiring she has coached tennis in Prague.

ITF finals

Singles (1–1)

Doubles (1–3)

References

External links
 
 

1977 births
Living people
Czech female tennis players
Czechoslovak female tennis players